The Court of Accounts of Moldova is the supreme public external audit institution, according to the provisions of the Law of the Court of Accounts no. 261-XVI, dated 5 December 2008, and is the only state public authority that controls the formation, management and use of public financial resources and management of public property by carrying out external audit in the public sector, confirming the compliance of the Republic of Moldova with the international standards on the best public external audit practices.

The court was established in 1994; the same year, it became member of international organizations EUROSAI and INTOSAI. It is located at 69 Ștefan cel Mare Boulevard, Chișinău, in a building inaugurated in 2009.

References

External links
Official website

Government audit
Government agencies of Moldova
Organizations based in Chișinău
1994 establishments in Moldova
Government agencies established in 1994
Supreme audit institutions